is a Japanese model and tarento. She is better known by her stage name Yukipoyo (ゆきぽよ). She is represented by her agency VIP Models Agency. Kimura's father is Japanese, her mother is half Filipino and half Spanish.

Kimura debuted as a reader model for the fashion magazine, egg in 2012. She also thrived on the video platform Vine, with over 60 million total views. She was a participant of The Bachelor Japan, aired on Amazon Prime Video in 2017 and The Bachelor Winter Games in 2018. By late 2018, Kimura had become active as a television personality, with numerous appearances on various variety programs.

Media

Television
 The Bachelor Winter Games (ABC)
  (Nippon TV)
  (Nippon TV)
  (Yomiuri TV)
  (Nippon TV)
  (Nippon TV)

Web series
  (Amazon Prime Video, 2017-2018)

Photobooks
  (2019/01/18)

DVD
 YukipoyoTube (2019/02/17)

References

External links
 
 
  - Yukipoyo's "Chippoyo TV!"

Japanese television personalities
Japanese female models
Japanese people of Filipino descent
1996 births
People from Kanagawa Prefecture
Living people
Japanese YouTubers